Badeau Hill is a mountain located in Central New York region of New York northwest of Elk Creek, New York.

References

Mountains of Otsego County, New York
Mountains of New York (state)